Five Steez is an independent underground Hip Hop artiste from Kingston, Jamaica. He began making a name for himself with his 'Momentum' mixtape series in 2010  and then his debut album, 'War for Peace', in August 2012. The album was well received by Hip Hop websites  as well as the Jamaican print media, which labelled it an unexpected landmark release from Jamaica. In October 2014, he released his EP, 'These Kingston Times', to equally rave reviews, followed by 2016's EP, 'HeatRockz'. He also organized Kingston, Jamaica's premier Hip Hop event, Pay Attention, from 2012 - 2015, with the local Hip Hop collective, The council, of which he is one-fourth. In 2019, he returned with the Mordecai-produced album, 'Love N Art', a campaign covered by the national newspaper, The Gleaner. Steez followed up 'Love N Art', with his second release for 2019, the EP 'Pantone', with French beatmaker J-Zen. In 2020, he released a sequel to his first EP with Mordecai, HeatRockz 2.0. For 2021, Five Steez teamed up with Brazilian producer SonoTWS for the album Quietude. Five Steez has been noted by The FADER as dominating Kingston's underground for some time.

Discography 
Albums
 2012: War for Peace
 2019: Love N Art (w/ Mordecai)
 2021: Quietude (w/ SonoTWS)

EPs
 2013: War for Peace (Remix EP)
 2014: These Kingston Times
 2016: HeatRockz (w/ Mordecai)
 2019: Pantone (w/ J-Zen)
 2020: HeatRockz 2.0 (w/ Mordecai)

Mixtapes
 2010: The Momentum: Volume One (w/ DJ Ready Cee)
 2011: Yard Rebel (w/ DJ MadLogic)
 2011: The Momentum: Volume Two (w/ DJ Ready Cee)
 2016: The Momentum: Volume Three (w/ DJ Ready Cee)

with The Council
 2016: Forgotten Parables (EP)
 2017: Nothing Else Matters (Album)

References

External links 
 FiveSteez.com
 Five Steez & J-Zen's Pantone EP
 Relearning, balancing and Hip Hop
 You Know His Steez
 Go behind the scenes with Jamaican Hip Hop Pioneer Five Steez
 Behind the Mic with Five Steez
 LargeUp Interview: Five Steez talks Jamaican Rap
 Interview: Five Steez - War for Peace (Jamaica)

Jamaican hip hop musicians
Jamaican rappers